"Eazy-er Said Than Dunn" is a song by American rapper Eazy-E. The song was released as the second single from his debut studio album, Eazy-Duz-It. The track was produced by Dr. Dre and DJ Yella.

Music video
The video shows N.W.A at a club playing the single to the crowd and wandering through Compton, California. The official music video was directed by John Lloyd Miller. According to Miller, Jay Roach was one of the cameramen for the video. Also on set, but not appearing in the video was future rapper Snoop Dogg.

Cover art
The front and back cover images of Eazy-er Said Than Dunn were made by photographer Ithaka Darin Pappas on November 11, 1988, at Ithaka's own apartment in the Miracle Mile neighborhood of Los Angeles. This was the same photography session that the official press photographs for the N.W.A album Straight Outta Compton were made.

Covers
DJ Quik covered the song under the title "Quikker Said Than Dunn" on his 2000 album, Balance & Options.

Charts

References

External links

Eazy-E songs
1988 singles
Song recordings produced by Dr. Dre
1988 songs
Songs written by Eddie Floyd
Songs written by Dr. Dre
Ruthless Records singles